Raja Horu is a 2013 Sri Lankan Sinhala comedy film directed and produced by Suranga de Alwis. It stars Ranjan Ramanayake, Arjuna Kamalanath, and Buddhika Jayaratne in lead roles along with Ariyasena Gamage, Himali Siriwardena and Sriyani Amarasena. Music composed by Sarath de Alwis. The film has influenced by Bollywood film Hera Pheri which itself was adopted from Malayalam film Ramji Rao Speaking which turn was based on 1971 Television film See The Man Run. It is the 1198th Sri Lankan film in the Sinhala cinema.

Cast
 Ranjan Ramanayake as Mahesh
 Arjuna Kamalanath as Sirimal
 Ariyasena Gamage as Sumanapala
 Buddhika Jayaratne as OIC Kapila
 Himali Siriwardena as Shanika
 Sriyani Amarasena as Mahesh's mother
 Sandun Wijesiri as Dunusinghe
 Ronnie Leitch as Manager
 D.B. Gangodathenna as Makka
 Eardley Wedamuni as Prabha
 Premadasa Vithanage as Mudalali
 Hemantha Iriyagama as Maradankadawala Gune
 Nishani Gamage as Siba
 Damitha Saluwadana

Soundtrack

References

External links
රජ හොරු දර්ශන තලයේ රසමුසු තැන්
දෙකයි පනහෙ කොම්පැණි එක්ක මගේ ඩීල් නැහැ

2013 films
2010s Sinhala-language films
Films directed by Suranga de Alwis